The Shengji Bronze Bell (Chinese: 聖積銅鐘; pinyin Shèngjī Tóngzhōng) is a bronze temple bell that was formerly located at a Buddhist temple known as Shengji Temple on Mount Emei in Sichuan Province, China.  It has been a Provincial-Level Protected Cultural Relic of Sichuan Province since 2002, and a Nationally Protected Cultural Relic of China since 2006.

History
The bell was created  1564, during the Ming dynasty. It was insribed with scriptural verses from the Agama Scriptures and was hung in the Treasure Building of the Shengji temple in 1567. In 1913, Sichuan Military Governor Yin Changheng ordered the bell to be melted to produce copper coins, but this did not occur. In 1959, the temple was destroyed, and the bell was kept in the ruins of the site. In 1966, during the  Cultural Revolution, the bell was sent to Chongqing to be melted down as part of the four olds, but because it was too large to fit in the furnace, it survived yet again but was vandalized. In 1983, a new Pavillion was constructed to display the bell.

References

Major_National_Historical_and_Cultural_Sites_in_Sichuan